Pontypridd is a town in Wales, United Kingdom.

Pontypridd may also refer to:
 Pontypridd (Senedd constituency)
 Pontypridd (UK Parliament constituency)
 Pontypridd railway station
 Pontypridd RFC, a rugby union club based in Pontypridd, Wales

See also
 Pontypridd, Caerphilly and Newport Railway
 Pontypridd Graig railway station
 Côr Meibion Pontypridd, a Welsh choir